Montbarla (Languedocien: Montvarlan) is a commune in the Tarn-et-Garonne department in the Occitanie region in southern France.

Geography
The Petite Barguelonne forms all of the commune's north-western and western borders, then flows into the Barguelonne, which forms all of the commune's southern border.

See also
Communes of the Tarn-et-Garonne department

References

Communes of Tarn-et-Garonne